Mixed climbing is a combination of ice climbing and rock climbing generally using ice climbing equipment such as crampons and ice tools. Mixed climbing has inspired its own specialized gear such as boots which are similar to climbing shoes but feature built-in crampons. Dry-tooling is mixed climbing's most specialized skill and has since evolved into a "sport" unto itself.

Terrain 
The terrain that is climbed on is diverse and consists of rock, turf, snow, and ice in varying amounts. Such terrain is typically encountered in the winter season or on high icy mountains.

Grading 
Grading of mixed terrain climbs roughly follows the WI rating system with respect to its physical and technical demands. The scale typically starts at M4 and subgrades of "-" and "+" are commonly used, although the distinctions are often subjective.

Techniques 
Climbers participating in mixed climbing use techniques from both ice climbing and rock climbing. The nature of the mixed terrain and has also led to the development of specialist techniques only implemented in mixed or dry tooling terrain, such as stein pulls and pick torquing.

Equipment 
A climber chooses their equipment based on the exact conditions and terrain that will be encountered as well as their climbing style and personal preferences. Mixed terrain climbing equipment typically includes both rock and ice climbing equipment. Specialist equipment has also been developed.

See also
 Alpine climbing
 Ice climbing
 Rock climbing
 Glossary of climbing terms

References 

Types of climbing
Types of Mountaineering